Christopher Robin Orchard is a South Australian artist and arts educator who began as a sculptor but subsequently specialised in drawing. His character, the Bald Man, is a recurrent motif. Orchard is Associate Professor at Adelaide Central School of Art and was the subject of the 2017 SALA Festival monograph, Christopher Orchard: The Uncertainty of the Poet. He is also the subject of the 2013 short documentary film Everyperson, by Jasper Button and Patrick Zoerner.

Biography 
Orchard was born in South Australia in 1950. Orchard's full name is Christopher Robin Orchard. He completed an Advanced Diploma in fine Art, Sculpture and Painting at the South Australia College of Advanced Education. He is a founding member of the Art Workers’ Union in 1979 and joined Central Studios in 1982.  From 1985-1987 he was a member of Air and Space Studios, London.  He joined the teaching staff of Adelaide Central School of Art in 1989. In 2005, he was appointed Adjunct Associate Professor at Flinders University. Orchard held his first solo exhibition in Adelaide in 1975.  In 1986, he presented his first British solo exhibition in London.  In 2011, he presented his first American solo exhibition in New York.

Artistic style and subject 
Orchard began as a sculptor but came to specialise in drawing. His works feature an avatar known as the Bald Man who emerged from Orchard’s “fight with the figure” and who, according to Orchard, represents ”the entire history of what it means to be human”.

Awards/Prizes/Residency 
 1985-1986: Berry Street Studios Residency
 2000: Gunnery Space
 2000: Finalist, Dobell Drawing Prize 
 2001: Finalist, Dobell Drawing Prize 
 2005: Finalist, Dobell Drawing Prize 
 2006: Finalist, Dobell Drawing Prize 
 2015: Invited Artist, Kedumba Drawing Award 
 2016: Finalist, Paul Guest Prize 
 2017: SALA Festival Featured Artist

References

External links 
 Personal website
 Entry in Design & Art Australia Online
 Documentary Everyperson

Living people
1950 births
Artists from South Australia
Australian contemporary artists
Artists from Adelaide
20th-century Australian artists
21st-century Australian artists
Australian art teachers